GCAP may refer to:

 Game Connect Asia Pacific, a game development conference
 GCap Media, British commercial radio company
 Global Call to Action Against Poverty, a global anti-poverty movement/coalition
 Global Combat Air Programme, a multinational fighter jet development
 Grupo Capoeira Angola Pelourinho, Capoeira group by Mestre Moraes
 Guanylate cyclase-activating protein
 Vancouver's greenest city action plan, an urban sustainability initiative of Vancouver

See also

GPAC (disambiguation)